East White Bluffs is an unincorporated community in Benton County, Washington, United States, located approximately 17 miles southwest of Othello on the Hanford Nuclear Reservation.

References

Unincorporated communities in Benton County, Washington
Northern Pacific Railway
Unincorporated communities in Washington (state)